TOM1-like protein 2 is a protein that in humans is encoded by the TOM1L2 gene.

References

Further reading